Fipravirimat is an experimental drug for the treatment of HIV/AIDS.  It belongs to a class of drugs known as maturation inhibitors.

Fipravirimat is being developed by ViiV Healthcare and as of 2023 is in Phase II clinical trials.

See also 
 BMS-955176

References 

Antiviral drugs
Carboxylic acids
Organofluorides
Pentacyclic compounds
Sulfones